Stockdale High School is a public high school located in Stockdale, Texas (USA) and classified as a 3A school by the UIL. It is part of the Stockdale Independent School District located in east central Wilson County. In 2015, the school was rated "Met Standard" by the Texas Education Agency.

Athletics
The Stockdale Brahmas compete in these sports - 

Baseball
Basketball
Cross Country
Football
Golf
Powerlifting
Softball
Tennis
Track and Field
Volleyball

References

External links
 

Schools in Wilson County, Texas
Public high schools in Texas